The 2015–16 Biathlon World Cup – World Cup 5 was held in Ruhpolding, Germany, from 13 January until 17 January 2016.

Schedule of events

Medal winners

Men

Women

References 

5
2016 in German sport
January 2016 sports events in Europe
2016 in Bavaria
World Cup - World Cup 5,2015-16
Sports competitions in Bavaria